Rachana Rimal (born 13 August 2002), is a Nepalese singer. She is credited for singing over one thousand Nepali songs in less than two years. Came into recognition through singing reality show Nepal Idol in 2019, she has established herself as one of the leading singers in Nepal. Some of her songs include Photo Firimma, Unko Preeti, Paani Chhamkine, and Mineral Water.

Early life 
Rachana Rimal was born on 13 August 2002 in Tehrathum; her family moved to Jhapa when she was an infant. She has been singing since the earliest age she can remember. She used to sing Bhajan on local occasions in her hometown, Jhapa. She also competed in many regional competitions. The first competition she won was held in a Facebook group; one of her teachers recorded her performance and uploaded a video to the group. Rimal received the highest number of likes and won the competition receiving a harmonium as a prize. In another competition, she received five hundred rupees as prize money, which she has still not spent.

Musical career 
Rimal competed in the singing reality program Nepal Idol in 2019. She placed in the top 8 position and set a record for being the highest-voted contestant three times in a row. She was subsequently sang Photo Firimma, written and composed by Shishir Bhandari, a YouTuber and media personality and released in 2020. Since has also sung other songs such as Unko Preeti, Mineral Water, and Paani Chhamkine.

Rimal posted a photo of herself attending a cricket match, and numerous news sources used the photo with a misleading title. This started a rumor that Rimal was invited to see a match by the Cricket Association of Nepal (CAN). She stated that she had purchased the ticket to attend the game and welcomed as a special guest after being recognized by CAN officials. There was also a rumor that CAN asked her for an explanation for her sudden arrival to watch a match without following proper protocols. Rimal and CAN denied this, calling it a mass media fabrication.

In early 2022, Rimal sang a remake version of Nabirse Timilai, originally sung by Anju Panta. The remake was not well received by some viewers and critics. Bipin Kiran, the song's author and lyricist, failed to acknowledge the original singer when the song was first released. Panta made a post regarding this matter on her social media account and claimed that the composer and arranger originally asked her to sing the remake version of this song, and she was also provided with a new arrangement of the song.

Selected discography 
Rimal has sung over one thousand songs; this list represents a few of her popular songs.

Awards

References

External links 
 

Living people
21st-century Nepalese women singers
Khas people
Dohori singers
2002 births
People from Tehrathum District
Nepali-language singers
Nepalese playback singers
Nepalese ghazal singers